USS Rockford (PF-48), a  in commission from 1944 to 1945, thus far has been the only ship of the United States Navy to be named for Rockford, Illinois. She later served in the Soviet Navy as EK-18 and in the Republic of Korea Navy as ROKS Apnokkang (62).

Construction and commissioning
Originally classified as a patrol gunboat, PG-156, Rockford was reclassified as a patrol frigate, PF-48, on 15 April 1943. She was laid down on 28 August 1943, by Consolidated Steel Corporation in Los Angeles, California, launched on 27 September 1943, sponsored by Mrs. Harry L. Crotzer, and commissioned on 6 March 1944.

Service history

U.S. Navy, World War II, 1944–1945
Following shakedown off Los Angeles, Rockford, manned by a United States Coast Guard crew, reported to the United States Pacific Fleet and got underway on 25 June 1944 for the Southwest Pacific. On 2 July 1944 she attacked a Japanese submarine with depth charges, doing some damage. She made a second antisubmarine attack with Hedgehogs antisubmarine mortars on 7 July 1945. Continuing her voyage, she proceeded via Espiritu Santo to Australia, arriving at Cairns, Queensland, on 23 July 1944.

On 2 August 1944, Rockford moored in Milne Bay, New Guinea, and then operated on convoy escort duty and antisubmarine patrol off the New Guinea coast until 23 September 1944, when she made a brief run to Manus Island in the Admiralty Islands.

Rockford then returned to New Guinea, remaining there until 15 October 1944, when she began a voyage to the United States West Coast via Manus Island and Pearl Harbor, Territory of Hawaii. On 13 November 1944, during the final leg of the voyage, Rockford and the minesweeper  attacked and sank the Japanese submarine I-12 midway between Hawaii and California; there were no survivors from I-12. In sinking I-12, Rockford and Ardent unwittingly had avenged the crew of the Liberty Ship SS John A. Johnson; on 30 October 1944, after sinking John A. Johnson, I-12 had rammed and sunk her lifeboats and rafts and then machine-gunned her 70 survivors, killing 10.

On 17 November 1944, Rockford arrived on the U.S. West Coast for scheduled repairs. After their completion, she reported for duty on 4 January 1945 to Commander, Alaskan Sea Frontier, for duty in the waters of the Territory of Alaska and the North Pacific, operating until August 1945 from Dutch Harbor, Cold Bay, and Adak as pilot vessel for the  group.

Selected for transfer to the Soviet Navy in Project Hula – a secret program for the transfer of U.S. Navy ships to the Soviet Navy at Cold Bay in anticipation of the Soviet Union joining the war against Japan – Rockford began training her new Soviet crew at Cold Bay in August 1945.

Soviet Navy, 1945–1949

Commissioned into the Soviet Navy immediately, Rockford was designated as a storozhevoi korabl ("escort ship") and renamed EK-18 in Soviet service. She soon departed Cold Bay bound for Petropavlovsk-Kamchatsky in the Soviet Union, where she served as a patrol vessel in the Soviet Far East.

In February 1946, the United States began negotiations for the return of ships loaned to the Soviet Union for use during World War II. On 8 May 1947, United States Secretary of the Navy James V. Forrestal informed the United States Department of State that the United States Department of the Navy wanted 480 of the 585 combatant ships it had transferred to the Soviet Union for World War II use returned, EK-18 among them. Negotiations for the return of the ships were protracted, but on 1 November 1949 the Soviet Union finally returned EK-18 to the U.S. Navy at Yokosuka, Japan.

Republic of Korea Navy, 1950–1952

Reverting to her original name, Rockford lay idle in the Pacific Reserve Fleet at Yokosuka until the United States loaned her to the Republic of Korea on 23 October 1950 for Korean War service in enforcing the United Nations blockade against North Korea and harassing enemy forces. She served the Republic of Korea Navy as ROKS Apnok (62). On 21 May 1952, she was escorting the U.S. Navy ammunition ship  when Mount Baker struck her amidships, killing 25 and injuring 21 of Apnoks crew. The collision damaged Apnok beyond economical repair. South Korea returned her to the U.S. Navy on 3 September 1952 for disposal.

Disposal
Reverting to her original name and assigned a status of "inactive out of commission in reserve" by the U.S. Navy, Rockford was struck from the Navy list on 26 May 1953 and sunk as a torpedo target on 30 September 1953.

Awards
The U.S. Navy awarded Rockford two battle stars for her World War II service.

References

External links 

 
hazegray.org: USS Rockford

 

Tacoma-class frigates
Ships built in Los Angeles
1943 ships
World War II frigates and destroyer escorts of the United States
Tacoma-class frigates of the Soviet Navy
World War II frigates of the Soviet Union
Cold War frigates of the Soviet Union
Tacoma-class frigates of the Republic of Korea Navy
Korean War frigates of South Korea
Maritime incidents in 1952
Maritime incidents in 1953
Ships sunk as targets
Ships transferred under Project Hula